Hoburg Shoal, also known as Hoburgs bank, is a shoal located in the Baltic Sea, in the southern zone of the Gotland shelf, south of Hoburgen.

Geography 
It is a long shoal, comprising a northern and a southern section, that lies to the south of the Storsudret peninsula in Sundre socken on the southern tip of Gotland, Sweden.

History 
, a pipeline is projected that may cross the area of the shoal.

References

External links 
Full text of "07WARSAW1975"

Shoals of the Baltic Sea
Gotland
Bird sanctuaries